Dammaj is a small town in the Sa'dahI Governorate of north-western Yemen, southeast by road from Sa'dah in a valley of the same name.

Muqbil bin Hadi al-Wadi'i established the Madrasah Dar al-Hadith in Dammaj in 1979, an important center of learning for followers of the Salafi creed (the methodology of Prophet Muhammad and his Companions and the two generations after them, (Tabi'in, Tabi al-Tabi'in)), who make up the majority of the town. In 2014, the non-local Salafis, including all of the students there, were evicted.

The town was at the target of the Siege of Dammaj, and in November 2013, further sectarian violence between militants of the Houthi-led Shia movement and Sunnis erupted in the town, creating many casualties; some 50 had been killed by the start of the second week. In one incident in late November, a mine exploded as a military vehicle was passing by, killing two Yemeni soldiers.

References

Populated places in Saada Governorate
Salafi movement